"The Fourth Avenue Cafe" is the thirtieth single by L'Arc-en-Ciel. Originally expected  on March 21, 1997, but due to drug charges against drummer Sakura it was only finally released on August 30, 2006. The single reached number 5 on the Oricon chart. Back in 1997, it was used as the 4th ending theme to the popular Rurouni Kenshin anime series, but was removed after a few episodes (for the same reasons listed above) and replaced with the previous ending song "Heart of Sword" by T.M. Revolution. The song does not appear on any officially released soundtracks for Rurouni Kenshin as well.

Track listing

Chart positions

References

2006 singles
L'Arc-en-Ciel songs
Songs written by Hyde (musician)
Songs written by Ken (musician)
Anime songs
2006 songs
Ki/oon Music singles